Cherry Island Range Rear Light is a lighthouse in Wilmington, Delaware, United States, on the Delaware River, just north of the Christina River, Delaware. It is  behind Cherry Island Range Front Light.  The present light is a skeletal tower supporting a red light.

Head keepers
 John A. Patterson 1880 – 1910
 Lawson Holland 1910 – 1915
 Charles E. Marshall 1919 – 1921
 Julian Bacon 1930 – 1933
 William H. Johnson 1938 – 1941

See also

 List of lighthouses in Delaware
 List of lighthouses in the United States

References

External links

 Picture of the active Cherry Island Range Rear

Lighthouses completed in 1880
Wilmington Riverfront
Buildings and structures in Wilmington, Delaware
Lighthouses in New Castle County, Delaware